The 1978 Chicago White Sox season was the team's 78th season in Major League Baseball, and its 79th overall. They finished with a record of 71-90, good enough for fifth place in the American League West, 20.5 games behind the first-place Kansas City Royals.

Offseason 
 November 28, 1977: Rich Hinton was signed as a free agent by the White Sox.
 December 5, 1977: Brian Downing, Chris Knapp, and Dave Frost were traded by the White Sox to the California Angels for Bobby Bonds, Thad Bosley and Richard Dotson.

Regular season 
 Larry Doby replaced Bob Lemon as manager of the White Sox in 1978. Doby was the second African-American to lead a major league club.

Opening Day lineup 
 Ralph Garr, LF
 Jorge Orta, 2B
 Lamar Johnson, 1B
 Bobby Bonds, RF
 Ron Blomberg, DH
 Chet Lemon, CF
 Eric Soderholm, 3B
 Wayne Nordhagen, C
 Don Kessinger, SS
 Steve Stone, P

Season standings

Record vs. opponents

Notable transactions 
 April 1, 1978: Royle Stillman was released by the White Sox.
 April 1, 1978: Bob Coluccio was released by the White Sox.
 July 17, 1978: Guy Hoffman was signed as an amateur free agent by the White Sox.

Draft picks 
 June 6, 1978: 1978 Major League Baseball Draft
 Britt Burns was drafted by the White Sox in the 3rd round.
 Bobby Meacham was drafted by the Chicago White Sox in the 14th round of the 1978 amateur draft, but did not sign. 
 Gary Gaetti was drafted by the White Sox in the 3rd round of the secondary phase, but did not sign.

Roster

Player stats

Batting 
Note: G = Games played; AB = At bats; R = Runs scored; H = Hits; 2B = Doubles; 3B = Triples; HR = Home runs; RBI = Runs batted in; BB = Base on balls; SO = Strikeouts; AVG = Batting average; SB = Stolen bases

Pitching 
Note: W = Wins; L = Losses; ERA = Earned run average; G = Games pitched; GS = Games started; SV = Saves; IP = Innings pitched; H = Hits allowed; R = Runs allowed; ER = Earned runs allowed; HR = Home runs allowed; BB = Walks allowed; K = Strikeouts

Farm system 

LEAGUE CHAMPIONS: Knoxville, Appleton

Notes

References 
 1978 Chicago White Sox at Baseball Reference

Chicago White Sox seasons
Chicago White Sox season
Chicago